The Federal Office for the Protection of the Constitution and Counterterrorism (Bundesamt für Verfassungsschutz und Terrorismusbekämpfung, "BVT") was an Austrian police organization that acts as a domestic intelligence agency. It is tasked with the protection of the constitutional organs of the Republic of Austria and their ability to function. The agency was created from the Austrian State police, as well as various special task forces targeting organized crime and terrorism that were under the direction of the Directorate General for Public Security (Generaldirektion für die öffentliche Sicherheit, "GDföS"), which itself is a department of the Federal Ministry of the Interior. The BVT publishes the Verfassungsschutzbericht, an annual report on the status of the protection of the constitution.

In late 2021, following criticism for perceived failures in preventing the 2020 Vienna attack, the BVT was dissolved and replaced with the new State Security and Intelligence Directorate (DSN).

History 
The BVT was created in 2002 through the reorganization of various special task forces of the Federal Ministry of the Interior and the former state police. This was undertaken as a reaction to a perceived danger to public security caused by an increase in international terrorism. In the wake of the September 11 attacks, Federal Minister of the Interior Ernst Strasser ordered the restructuring of Austrian counterterrorism efforts.

Gert-René Polli, an officer of the Heeresnachrichtenamt, was named director. After Polli's resignation in October 2007, Peter Gridling, a former director of an Austrian counterterrorism task force, was named his successor.

On February 28, 2018, the BVT was raided by Austrian Federal Police under orders of prosecutors acting on an anti-corruption investigation, taking sensitive info on far-right groups known to be close to the FPÖ. Peter Gridling was suspended from duty when the raids occurred.

In the aftermath of the 2020 Vienna attack, Erich Zwettler was suspended from his work with the BVT and the organization was replaced by the new DSN. According to a Vienna-based European diplomat, the BVT was "so compromised that for a time it was cut out of much European intelligence sharing activity". The BVT was alleged to be compromised by Russian intelligence agents, to the extent that it was at one point suspended from European intelligence sharing. An Austrian official stated that they were implementing wide reform of its security agencies.

Organization 
The legal basis for the BVT is the Sicherheitspolizeigesetz ("Federal Security Police Act"). The BVT exists as a federal office with nine bureaus, one in each of the nine states of Austria, generally located alongside the state police in the capital of each respective state.

For oversight of the BVT, the Austrian National Council created a standing subcommittee for internal affairs.

References

External links 
 Internet page of the BVT as a subsection of the Federal Ministry of the Interior 
Federal Security Police Act 
Falter article from March 2003 examining the police reforms instituted in 2002
Report  from the Österreichischer Rechnungshof from 13 January 2009

Austrian intelligence agencies
Law enforcement in Austria
Domestic intelligence agencies
Defunct intelligence agencies